The 1931 Invercargill mayoral election was part of the New Zealand local elections held that same year. The polling was conducted using the standard first-past-the-post electoral method.

Incumbent mayor John D. Campbell was narrowly defeated by the former mayor John Miller.

Results
The following table gives the election results:

References

1931 elections in New Zealand
Mayoral elections in Invercargill